Cynisca rouxae is a worm lizard species in the family Amphisbaenidae. The species is endemic to the Ivory Coast.

Etymology
The specific name, rouxae (genitive, feminine, singular), is in honor of French herpetologist Mme. Rolande Roux-Estève.

Habitat
The preferred habitats of C. rouxae are forest and savanna.

Reproduction
C. rouxae is oviparous.

References

Further reading
Brygoo E-R (1990). "Les types d'Amphisbaenidés, Pygopodidés, Xantusiidés (Reptiles, Sauriens) du Muséum national d'Histoire naturelle – Catalogue critique". Bulletin du Muséum National d'Histoire Naturelle (Ser. 4) A (3-4), suppl.: 3–8. (in French).
Gans C (2005). "Checklist and Bibliography of the Amphisbaenia of the World". Bulletin of the American Museum of Natural History (289): 1–130. (Cynisca rouxae, p. 29).
Hahn DE (1979). "A new species of Cynisca (Amphisbaenidae) from the Ivory Coast" Copeia 1979 (1): 122–125. (Cynisca rouxae, new species).
Rödel M-O, Grabow K (1996). "Zur Kenntnis von Cynisca rouxae Hahn, 1979 (Contributions to the knowledge of Cynisca rouxae Hahn, 1979)". Salamandra 32 (1): 13–22. (in German, with an abstract in English).

Cynisca (lizard)
Reptiles described in 1979
Taxa named by Donald E. Hahn
Endemic fauna of Ivory Coast